In eight-dimensional geometry, a cantellated 8-simplex is a convex uniform 8-polytope, being a cantellation of the regular 8-simplex.

There are six unique cantellations for the 8-simplex, including permutations of truncation.

Cantellated 8-simplex

Alternate names
 Small rhombated enneazetton (acronym: srene) (Jonathan Bowers)

Coordinates 
The Cartesian coordinates of the vertices of the cantellated 8-simplex can be most simply positioned in 9-space as permutations of (0,0,0,0,0,0,1,1,2). This construction is based on facets of the cantellated 9-orthoplex.

Images

Bicantellated 8-simplex

Alternate names
 Small birhombated enneazetton (acronym: sabrene) (Jonathan Bowers)

Coordinates 
The Cartesian coordinates of the vertices of the bicantellated 8-simplex can be most simply positioned in 9-space as permutations of (0,0,0,0,0,1,1,2,2). This construction is based on facets of the bicantellated 9-orthoplex.

Images

Tricantellated 8-simplex

Alternate names
 Small trirhombihexadecaexon (acronym: satrene) (Jonathan Bowers)

Coordinates 
The Cartesian coordinates of the vertices of the tricantellated 8-simplex can be most simply positioned in 9-space as permutations of (0,0,0,0,0,1,1,2,2). This construction is based on facets of the tricantellated 9-orthoplex.

Images

Cantitruncated 8-simplex

Alternate names
 Great rhombated enneazetton (acronym: grene) (Jonathan Bowers)

Coordinates 
The Cartesian coordinates of the vertices of the cantitruncated 8-simplex can be most simply positioned in 9-space as permutations of (0,0,0,0,0,0,1,2,3). This construction is based on facets of the bicantitruncated 9-orthoplex.

Images

Bicantitruncated 8-simplex

Alternate names
 Great birhombated enneazetton (acronym: gabrene) (Jonathan Bowers)

Coordinates 
The Cartesian coordinates of the vertices of the bicantitruncated 8-simplex can be most simply positioned in 9-space as permutations of (0,0,0,0,0,1,2,3,3). This construction is based on facets of the bicantitruncated 9-orthoplex.

Images

Tricantitruncated 8-simplex

 Great trirhombated enneazetton (acronym: gatrene) (Jonathan Bowers)

Coordinates 
The Cartesian coordinates of the vertices of the tricantitruncated 8-simplex can be most simply positioned in 9-space as permutations of (0,0,0,0,1,2,3,3,3). This construction is based on facets of the bicantitruncated 9-orthoplex.

Images

Related polytopes 

This polytope is one of 135 uniform 8-polytopes with A8 symmetry.

Notes

References
 H.S.M. Coxeter: 
 H.S.M. Coxeter, Regular Polytopes, 3rd Edition, Dover New York, 1973 
 Kaleidoscopes: Selected Writings of H.S.M. Coxeter, edited by F. Arthur Sherk, Peter McMullen, Anthony C. Thompson, Asia Ivic Weiss, Wiley-Interscience Publication, 1995,  
 (Paper 22) H.S.M. Coxeter, Regular and Semi Regular Polytopes I, [Math. Zeit. 46 (1940) 380-407, MR 2,10]
 (Paper 23) H.S.M. Coxeter, Regular and Semi-Regular Polytopes II, [Math. Zeit. 188 (1985) 559-591]
 (Paper 24) H.S.M. Coxeter, Regular and Semi-Regular Polytopes III, [Math. Zeit. 200 (1988) 3-45]
 Norman Johnson Uniform Polytopes, Manuscript (1991)
 N.W. Johnson: The Theory of Uniform Polytopes and Honeycombs, Ph.D. 
  x3o3x3o3o3o3o3o - srene, o3x3o3x3o3o3o3o - sabrene, o3o3x3o3x3o3o3o - satrene, x3x3x3o3o3o3o3o - grene, o3x3x3x3o3o3o3o - gabrene, o3o3x3x3x3o3o3o - gatrene

External links 
 Polytopes of Various Dimensions
 Multi-dimensional Glossary

8-polytopes